Quax the Crash Pilot is a 1941 German comedy film directed by Kurt Hoffmann and starring Heinz Rühmann, Karin Himboldt and Lothar Firmans. It is also sometimes translated as Quax the Test Pilot. It features the popular song "Homeland, Your Stars".

The film set in the 1930s before the outbreak of the Second World War. It is based on an aviation story by Hermann Grote about an everyday man who wins a newspaper competition that offers free flying lessons. Despite initial struggles, he gradually shows himself to be a good pilot.

Much of the film was shot on location in Bavaria. Interiors were shot at the Tempelhof and Babelsberg Studios in Berlin and the Bavaria Studios in Munich. It was followed by a sequel Quax in Africa which was also made during the Nazi era, but not released until 1947.

Main cast 
Heinz Rühmann as Otto "Quax" Groschenbügel
Karin Himboldt as Marianne Bredow
Lothar Firmans as Hansen, Fluglehrer
Harry Liedtke as Herr Bredow
Elga Brink as Frau Bredow
Hilde Sessak as Adelheid
Leo Peukert as Bürgermeister
Georg Vogelsang as Der alte Krehlert
Beppo Brem as Knecht Alois
Lutz Götz as Herr Busse
Arthur Schröder as Flugarzt
Franz Zimmermann as Harry Peters, Flugschüler
Kunibert Gensichen as Walter Ottermann, Flugschüler
Manfred Heidmann as Ludwig Mommsen, Flugschüler
Guenther Markert as Gottfried Müller, Flugschüler
José Held as Karl Bruhn, Flugschüler

References

Bibliography

External links 

1941 films
1941 comedy films
German comedy films
Films of Nazi Germany
1940s German-language films
German black-and-white films
Films based on German novels
German aviation films
Terra Film films
Films set in the 1930s
Films shot in Bavaria
Films directed by Kurt Hoffmann
Films shot at Babelsberg Studios
Films shot at Tempelhof Studios
Films shot at Bavaria Studios
1940s German films